The 2023 Giro will start in Ortona and end in Rome being held 6 to 28 May. There will be 3 Individual time trial stages and 6 stages longer than 200km.

Teams

UCI WorldTeams

 
 
 
 
 
 
 
 
 
 
 
 
 
 
 
 
 
 

UCI ProTeams

Pre-race favourites 
Jai Hindley, Remco Evenepoel, Geraint Thomas and Primož Roglič are said to favor the 2023 course.

Route and stages

References

External links 

 

2023
2023 in road cycling
2023 in Italian sport
 
2023 UCI World Tour
May 2023 sports events in Italy